Jolimont railway station is located on the Mernda and Hurstbridge lines in Victoria, Australia. It serves the inner eastern Melbourne suburb of East Melbourne, and opened on 21 October 1901.

Jolimont is one of two stations that are close to the Melbourne Cricket Ground (MCG), the other being Richmond. During events at the MCG, extra exit gates are open to reduce crowding.

History

Jolimont station opened on 21 October 1901, when a direct line was provided between Princes Bridge and Collingwood. Like the locality itself, the station was named after the French words 'joli mont', which translates to 'pretty mount' in English. The name was believed to have been given by the French-Swiss wife of Charles Joseph La Trobe, Victoria's first Governor.

The original timber station building was manufactured in England in 1899. In the late 1920s, it was sold and re-erected in Canberra, on the site of the present Jolimont Centre. After being damaged by fire, it was demolished in 1977.

In 1973, additional entrances and exits were provided. In 1985, the station was renamed Jolimont MCG, and at the time it was noted that it was unique in that no advertising was permitted on the station site, according to the construction finance contract.

In November 2015, extra shelter and seats were provided on both platforms.

Platforms and services

Jolimont has two side platforms. It is served by Mernda and Hurstbridge line trains.

Platform 1:
  services to Flinders Street
  services to Flinders Street

Platform 2:
  all stations services to Mernda
  all stations and limited express services to Macleod, Greensborough, Eltham and Hurstbridge

Transport links

Yarra Trams operates two routes via Jolimont station:
 : North Balwyn – Victoria Harbour (Docklands)
 : Vermont South – Central Pier (Docklands)

Gallery

References

External links

 Melway

East Melbourne, Victoria
Railway stations in Australia opened in 1901
Railway stations in Melbourne
Railway stations in the City of Melbourne (LGA)